St Mary's Church is a cave church in Tuminec, Korçë County, Albania. It is a Cultural Monument of Albania.

References

Cultural Monuments of Albania
Buildings and structures in Pustec Municipality
Cave churches
Churches in Korçë County